Free tekno, also known as tekno, freetekno and hardtek, is the music predominantly played at free parties in Europe. The spelling of the word tekno is made to deliberately differentiate the musical style from that of techno. The music is fast and it can vary between 150 and 185 bpm and is characterised by a pounding repetitive kick drum. Nevertheless, bass drum distortion by clipping is used less often as in the related genre of mainstyle hardcore. Nowadays, some tekno producers also use drum sets that rather sound trancey, since many members of the tekno subculture as well as the psytrance subculture frequently attend the same raves and the two scenes are closely connected.

History

Tekno evolved in tandem with the teknival movement in the early 1990s since many of the teknival organisers and DJs were also making music. The music drew on influences such as hardcore, rave, jungle, early hardcore and techno, with the producers taking the sound in a darker direction. Spiral tribe were the first to start making and widely disseminating this genre taking it to France and Eastern Europe after the Criminal Justice act was implemented in the UK. An emphasis is placed on samples from TV shows, films and popular culture which are placed at strategic moments in the tracks. The music was produced with whatever was available: drum machines, synthesisers and keyboards as well as computer programs such as audio/MIDI sequencers and Trackers, sometimes even hitting a random table with a pen. Starting from year 2001 there has been a trend using laptop and laptops for live performances, because the capabilities of both the hardware and software were improving very quick.

With the evolution of the genre it has come to be known by a number of names, including spiral tekno, hardtek, tribetek, tribe and lately evolved in many other subgenres like pumping tek, hardfloor and Frenchcore which is a sort of mixture between mainstream hardcore and hardtekno, with funny and pumping samples taken from different media supports.

Tekno producers come from numerous places, particularly in Europe, including the United Kingdom, the Netherlands, Italy, France, Germany, Austria and the Czech Republic. Some of the most active artist who from the early 1990s up till the mid 2000s were Spiral Tribe, Crystal Distortion, Lego, Liqitex, 69db, Ixy, Kaos, Jack Acid, Curley, Unit Moebius, Les Boucles Etranges, Yale, FKY, Babyon Joke, Arobass, Gotek, Frank@, Floxytek, Suburbass, Zone-33, Mat Weasel Buster, Narkotek, Kernel Panik, Revolt99, Infrabass, Vinka, Banditos, La Bloukak, Diablo (LSDF), Teknambul, Spiralheadz, Asphalt-Pirates, Aya Sound, Puissance K, Guigoo, Billx, Maissouille, Key Gen, Psychospores, Fractal, Sceletor, and Lyzor-sak.

Many record labels contributed spreading the sound mostly via underground distribution operated mostly by record shops / labels such as Hokus Pokus (Paris) and Toolbox Records (Paris), and record labels such as Tek No Logique (TNL), Narkotek and Astrofonik.
Here a list of some of the most active record labels
Network 23 record label Spiral Tribe sound system, Hokus Pokus, Passe Muraille, Perce Oreille, Infrabass, KGB Records, OQP Crue Production, dSP records, Tek No Logique, Narkotek, Astrofonik, Le Diable Au Corps.

Artists within this genre usually follow a very different ideology when compared to more modern and mainstream producers:
 Artists often use many pseudonyms, as they are not interested in mainstream success or recognition
 Most are not interested in profit
 They also support the free distribution of their works, as they do not see it as their own material, but as something that belongs to the fans and the community
This is described as "returning to the roots".

Subgenres

Jungletek and Raggatek is a subgenres derived directly from Hardtek. These well known genres collide to create fast energetic 190 BPM dance floor smashers. Kicked of around 2008 in the UK Mandidextrous & Vandal were among the first producers to start writing this genre of music. It breathed new life into the underground rave scene not only here in the UK but also picking up a strong following in Italy, Spain and Austria to mention a few.  Massive influence for this music also came from the Techno scene in Europe where some of the first underground music lovers started to up the bpm and add variations in structure thus becoming Tekno. Techno in the UK in the early 1990s was based on a bpm of 130-140. By the 2000s music on its never ending journey of progression had gained more speed and Hardtek was starting to dominate UK raves especially in the South and London.. Even Trance had progressed from sweeping delicate melody's to whats now known as Hardtrance a faster, harder more bouncy music to its predecessor. Music all over the underground was getting harder and faster. In today's world the most recent and noticeable evaluation in music is the progression of DnB into Neuro Funk, very similar to DnB but with grittier and harsher bass and synth sounds often using masses of compression to get those tearing bass line which is now worlds apart from one of the original DnB genres pioneered by Carl Cox Jungletechno.

Raggatek is predominantly influenced by Reggae and Ragga music, incorporating Jungle, DnB, Dancehall, Reggae, Ragga and Techno music. Well known MC's such as YT and Top Cat are a massive influence on the world of Raggatek. Producers loving this type of sound wanted to bring it to the dance floors of the underground. Upping the bpm to between 180 – 200 adding amen breaks and the basic structure of Hardtek that kick bass kick bass format was the formula for a  new hybrid music. The big sounding Ragga style vocals are often a massive presence on Raggatek productions.

Jungletek works on exactly the same formula as Raggatek just replace the Ragga with Jungle & DnB. Being less known for the vocal arrangements and more about the bass lines. Jungletek takes the basics of the bass line from well known Jungle and DnB tracks and recreates them in a Hardtek format. Original productions also use the simple format of kick bass with amen breaks. European Raggatek and Jungletek is often recognisable by the high energy eletro sounds in the bass lines and synth melody's.

Notes

External links
Freetekno.org website
Freetekno stable archive 

Musical subcultures
Electronic dance music genres
Teknivals
Techno genres